Michael Valgren Hundahl (né Andersen; born 7 February 1992) is a Danish professional road racing cyclist, who currently rides for UCI WorldTeam . In 2018, Valgren won Omloop Het Nieuwsblad and the Amstel Gold Race.

Career
He became a professional in 2011 at the age of just 19 riding for the Danish continental team , where he won two editions of the U23 Liège–Bastogne–Liège and several other noticeable wins. He worked in the same fish factory as Jonas Vingegaard while pursuing a career as a pro cyclist.

In 2014 he entered the WorldTour, when he joined . He made an immediate impact, as he won the Danish National Road Race Championships and the Danmark Rundt.

He has ridden the Tour de France 6 times (2015 to 2020) as well as the 2014 Vuelta a Espana. 2018 served as a breakout year seeing him win the classics Omloop Het Nieuwsblad and the Amstel Gold Race.

In November 2020, Valgren signed a two-year contract with the  team. He was added to the start list of the Tour de France for the 7th time in his career in 2021.

Major results

2009
 2nd Time trial, National Junior Road Championships
 3rd Overall Grand Prix Général Patton
1st Stage 1
 6th Overall Trofeo Karlsberg
 8th Overall Niedersachsen-Rundfahrt der Junioren
2010
 National Junior Road Championships
2nd Time trial
3rd Road race
 10th Time trial, UCI Juniors Road World Championships
 10th Overall Liège–La Gleize
2011
 4th Himmerland Rundt
2012
 1st Liège–Bastogne–Liège Espoirs
 2nd Eschborn–Frankfurt City Loop U23
 6th Overall Kreiz Breizh Elites
 8th Overall Coupe des nations Ville Saguenay
2013
 1st  Overall Flèche du Sud
1st  Young rider classification
1st Stage 3
 1st Liège–Bastogne–Liège Espoirs
 1st Stage 3 Tour de l'Avenir
 2nd Eschborn–Frankfurt City Loop U23
 9th Overall Thüringen Rundfahrt der U23
 10th GP Herning
2014
 National Road Championships
1st  Road race
3rd Time trial
 1st  Overall Danmark Rundt
1st  Young rider classification
 3rd Overall Four Days of Dunkirk
 4th Overall Tour des Fjords
 4th Japan Cup
2015
 1st  Young rider classification, Dubai Tour
2016
 1st  Overall Danmark Rundt
1st Stage 3
 National Road Championships
2nd Road race
2nd Time trial
 2nd Amstel Gold Race
2017
 2nd Overall Danmark Rundt
 6th Overall BinckBank Tour
 6th E3 Harelbeke
2018
 1st Amstel Gold Race
 1st Omloop Het Nieuwsblad
 2nd Bretagne Classic
 4th Tour of Flanders
 7th Road race, UCI Road World Championships
 8th Grand Prix Cycliste de Montréal
 9th Grand Prix Cycliste de Québec
2019
 4th Bretagne Classic
 5th Grand Prix Cycliste de Montréal
 6th Road race, UCI Road World Championships
 6th Chrono des Nations
 10th Overall BinckBank Tour
2021
 1st Coppa Sabatini
 1st Giro della Toscana
 3rd  Road race, UCI Road World Championships
 4th Road race, National Road Championships

Grand Tour general classification results timeline

Classics results timeline

References

External links

1992 births
Living people
Danish male cyclists
Danmark Rundt winners
People from Thisted Municipality
Olympic cyclists of Denmark
Cyclists at the 2020 Summer Olympics
Sportspeople from the North Jutland Region